Oil and Vinegar is a screenplay that was written but never filmed. It is a screenplay that John Hughes wrote and that Howard Deutch planned to direct. It would have starred Molly Ringwald and Matthew Broderick.

Plot
A soon-to-be-married man and a hitchhiking girl end up talking about their lives during the length of the car ride.

Production

Casting
The film was set to have Molly Ringwald and Matthew Broderick as the two main characters.

Development
The screenplay was written by Hughes, with Howard Deutch set to direct. Its style was said to be similar to The Breakfast Club (1985) but instead of taking place in detention, it would have taken place in a car with Ringwald's and Broderick's characters both discussing their lives to each other.

Future
When asked about Oil and Vinegar Howard Deutch said,

Yes. That was John's favorite script and he was saving it for himself, and I convinced him to let me do it. It was the story of a traveling salesman that Matthew Broderick was going to play, and a rock-and-roll girl, a real rocker. Polar opposites. Molly [Ringwald] was going to play that. And I had to make a personal decision about whether to go forward or not. We had rehearsals in a couple weeks, and I was exhausted, and my girlfriend Lea Thompson, who became my wife, said, "You're going to die. You can't do this. I'm not going to stick around and watch that." And I think it was also sprinkled with the fact that I wanted to do one movie that was my movie, not necessarily in service to John, even though I loved John. So between the two things, I didn't... It could still happen. I would do it. Not with Matthew and Molly anymore, but the script is still there. It doesn't need anything. It's one of his great scripts. He had so many great scripts. For instance, he would stay up all night, music blasting, and at like 5:30 or 6 a.m., he'd hand me what was supposed to be a rewrite on Some Kind of Wonderful. We needed five pages, and it was 50 pages. I said, "What did you do?! What is this?" and he said, "Oh, I didn't do that. I did something else. Tell me what you think?" And it was Ferris Bueller's Day Off. He wrote the first half of the movie in, like, eight hours, and then finished it a couple days later. That was John. I never knew a writer who could do that. No one else had that ability. Even the stuff I fished out of the garbage was gold.

References

Unproduced screenplays
Cancelled films
Films with screenplays by John Hughes (filmmaker)